Derrick Waldroup (born October 22, 1962) is an American wrestler. He competed in the men's Greco-Roman 90 kg at the 1996 Summer Olympics.

References

1962 births
Living people
American male sport wrestlers
Olympic wrestlers of the United States
Wrestlers at the 1996 Summer Olympics
Sportspeople from Chicago
Pan American Games medalists in wrestling
Pan American Games silver medalists for the United States
Wrestlers at the 1987 Pan American Games